Rienk Feenstra (1920–2005) was an international expert in Greek philately, writing and editing key reference books in this area, especially on the stamps and postal history of Crete. He was chairman of the Hellenic Philatelic Society of Netherlands for 6 years and then its Honorary Chairman. He was awarded the Resistance Medal, was a knight of the Order of Orange-Nassau (Orde van Oranje Nassau) and received numerous awards for his philatelic writing.

See also
Postage stamps and postal history of Crete
Postage stamps and postal history of Greece

References

 Rienk M. Feenstra Crete: Postal History - Stamps (Postzegelvereniging Griekenland, 1986)
 A. Papaioannou & Rienk M. Feenstra Greece: A Collection of Forgeries (Bank of Crete, 1996)
 Rienk M. Feenstra & Friends, Crete: Postal History, Postage and Revenue Stamps, Coins & Banknotes (collectio, 2001)
In Memoriam appreciation by B. de Hon, Chairman, The Hellenic Philatelic Society of Netherlands in collectio auction catalogue #48 (2005).

Dutch philatelists
1920 births
2005 deaths
Knights of the Order of Orange-Nassau